The 2019 Internationaux Féminins de la Vienne was a professional tennis tournament played on indoor hard courts. It was the twenty-sixth edition of the tournament which was part of the 2019 ITF Women's World Tennis Tour. It took place in Poitiers, France between 21 and 27 October 2019.

Singles main-draw entrants

Seeds

 1 Rankings are as of 14 October 2019.

Other entrants
The following players received wildcards into the singles main draw:
  Lou Adler
  Tatiana Golovin
  Manon Léonard
  Alice Tubello

The following players received entry from the qualifying draw:
  Sara Cakarevic
  Magali Kempen
  Lidziya Marozava
  Angelica Moratelli
  Yana Morderger
  Anastasiya Shoshyna
  Lucrezia Stefanini
  Margot Yerolymos

Champions

Singles

 Nina Stojanović def.  Liudmila Samsonova, 6–2, 7–6(7–2)

Doubles

 Amandine Hesse /  Harmony Tan def.  Tayisiya Morderger /  Yana Morderger, 6–4, 6–2

References

External links
 2019 Internationaux Féminins de la Vienne at ITFtennis.com
 Official website

2019 ITF Women's World Tennis Tour
2019 in French tennis
October 2019 sports events in France
Internationaux Féminins de la Vienne